Driny is a limestone cave in West Slovakia in the Little Carpathians Mountains. It is located around 2 km southwest of the village of Smolenice.

The cave's entrance altitude is 399 m.

The first attempt to enter the cave was made by Prussian soldiers, who were camping nearby during the Austro-Prussian War. It was finally explored in 1929, and in 1934 the first 175-metre route was opened. In 1950 other parts of the cave were explored and in 1959, the cave was reopened. The cave was declared a nature monument in 1968 and became part of the newly designated Little Carpathians Protected Landscape Area in 1976.

Today, of the total explored length of 636 m, 550 m are open to the public.

External links
 Driny on the Slovak Caves Association page

Show caves in Slovakia
Geography of Trnava Region
Tourist attractions in Trnava Region